BBC California, before 2011 known as Beluga Fraternity and briefly Fraternity, is a German general cargo ship owned by Beluga Shipping. In 2009 she and her sister ship, transited the Northern Sea Route while carrying power plant components from Ulsan, South Korea, to the Russian port of Vladivostok. The voyage was widely covered and sometimes incorrectly said to be the first time when non-Russian ships make the transit. In 1997, a Finnish oil tanker, Uikku, sailed the length of the Northern Sea Route from Murmansk to the Bering Strait, becoming the first Western ship to complete the voyage.

References

Cargo ships of Germany
2007 ships